Sir James Dalrymple, 1st Baronet (1650 – May 1719) was a Scottish writer who served as the Principal Clerk of Session. He was the son of the jurist James Dalrymple, 1st Viscount Stair (1619–1695). He is known as contributing to the debate over the Union between England and Scotland with his Collections Concerning the Scottish History (1705)

Works
Dalrymple wrote:

 Apology for himself, 1690, Edinburgh, 1825.
 Collections concerning the Scottish History preceding the death of King David the First in 1153. Wherein the sovereignty of the Crown and independency of the Church are cleared, and an account given of the antiquity of the Scottish British Church and the noveltie of Popery in this Kingdom, Edinburgh, 1705. William Atwood published Remarks on the Collections, which were also adversely criticised by John Gillane (Gillan), biographer of John Sage, in 1714. 
 A Vindication of the Ecclesiastical Part of Sir John Dalrymple's Historical Collections: in answer to a pamphlet entitled "The Life of Mr. John Sage", Edinburgh, 1714.

References

 Oxford Dictionary of National Biography

Attribution

1650 births
1719 deaths
Baronets in the Baronetage of Nova Scotia
Scottish antiquarians
Younger sons of viscounts
Principal Clerks of Session and Justiciary
17th-century Scottish people
18th-century Scottish people
Scottish knights
17th-century Scottish historians
18th-century Scottish historians
19th-century British civil servants
18th-century Scottish writers 
17th-century Scottish writers